Nard Jones (1904–1972) was an American writer, best known for his novels set in Oregon and the Pacific Northwest.

Life
According to Jones' self-description in "Puget Sound Profiles",
he was born in Seattle and graduated with honors from Whitman College, beginning his career as a campus correspondent for the Walla Walla Daily Bulletin. He was chief editorial writer for the Seattle Post-Intelligencer.

He lived in the city of Weston, Oregon with his parents between 1919 and 1927. Jones described himself as an "un-reconstructed Puget Sounder -- a salmon eater, an apple knocker, a rain worshiper, a sage-brusher, a whistle punk from the big woods and a fancier of mountain peaks at sunrise".

He wrote and narrated short stories for the radio program "Puget Sound Profiles" broadcast in the early 1960s on over a dozen stations in Washington State, including KOMO, KTAC, and KAGT, among others.

Jones lived and worked in several parts of the United States but focused most of his career on the Puget Sound Country. He wrote over 300 short stories for magazines and 17 books, 12 of them novels.

Oregon Detour
Jones' first novel, Oregon Detour, was set in a fictional Oregon town of 600 inhabitants called Creston. When his novel, written according to the tenets of the New Realism literary movement (established years before by Sherwood Anderson, Sinclair Lewis and others), was published in 1930, many of the residents of Weston were convinced that his characters were based on local inhabitants, and considered the work a slander against the town.

While the legend that Jones was sued and run out of town for his book is not true, some residents of the town did in fact make an effort to suppress local access to the book. Copies of the novel were stolen from the local library; after the novel became the subject for a high school student's book report, his English teacher removed the book from both the reading list and the high school library. According to George Venn, local literary historian, even in the 1980s "trying to figure out or trying to remember who the 'real people' in the novel is still a local pastime."

Works

Further reading

References

 Oregon Detour, Oregon State University Press
 Nard Jones (1904-1972), by Walt Curtis 1995 for Oregon Cultural Heritage Commission
 

Writers from Oregon
1972 deaths
1904 births